Cherven may refer to:

 Cherven (fortress), a medieval fortress of the Second Bulgarian Empire
 Cherven, Ruse Province, Bulgaria
 Cherven Peak, Antarctica
 Chervyen, a city in Belarus sometimes transliterated as Cherven

See also
 
 Czerwień, a West Slavic settlement located near the site of modern Czermno, Poland